Simdega College, established in 1960, is a general degree college in Simdega, Jharkhand. It offers undergraduate courses in arts, commerce and sciences. Simdega College is a constituent unit of Ranchi University.

See also
Education in India
Ranchi University
Simdega
Literacy in India
List of institutions of higher education in Jharkhand

References

External links
http://simdegacollegesimdega.com/index.html

Colleges affiliated to Ranchi University
Educational institutions established in 1960
Universities and colleges in Jharkhand
1960 establishments in Bihar